José Alexander Siri (born July 22, 1995) is a Dominican professional baseball outfielder for the Tampa Bay Rays of Major League Baseball (MLB). Siri signed with the Cincinnati Reds as an international free agent in 2012. He made his MLB debut in 2021 with the Houston Astros, who traded him to the Rays in 2022.

Career

Cincinnati Reds
Siri signed with the Cincinnati Reds as an international free agent on September 21, 2012. He made his professional debut the next year with the Dominican Summer League Reds. He spent the 2014 season with the Arizona League Reds, hitting .248/.310/.376 in 46 games. He played in 46 games the following year with the AZL Reds and the rookie-level Billings Mustangs, slashing .244/.261/.438 with 3 home runs and 19 RBI. Siri split the 2016 season between Billings and the Single-A Dayton Dragons, hitting a cumulative .275/.301/.463 with 10 home runs and 38 RBI in 86 games. Siri began the 2017 season with Dayton. During the season, he broke the Midwest League record for consecutive games with a hit. The record was previously held by  Tony Toups with 35 in 1977. He batted .293 with Dayton, leading the league in runs (92) and stolen bases (46). The Reds added him to their 40-man roster after the season on November 20, 2017.

In 2018, Siri split the season between the High-A Daytona Tortugas and the Double-A Pensacola Blue Wahoos, hitting .239/.294/.449 with 13 home runs and 43 RBI in 96 games between the two teams. He split 2019 between the Double-A Chattanooga Lookouts and the Triple-A Louisville Bats, logging a .237/.300/.357 slash line with 11 home runs and 53 RBI in 131 total contests. On January 27, 2020, Siri was designated for assignment by the Reds.

On February 3, 2020, Siri was claimed off waivers by the Seattle Mariners. On March 10, 2020, Siri was claimed off waivers by the San Francisco Giants. On July 23, Siri was designated for assignment by the Giants. He was outrighted on July 30. Siri did not play in a game in 2020 due to the cancellation of the minor league season because of the COVID-19 pandemic. He became a free agent after the season on November 2, 2020.

Houston Astros
On December 23, 2020, Siri signed a minor league contract with the Houston Astros organization. In 2021, Siri began the season with the Triple-A Sugar Land Skeeters. He played in 94 games for the Skeeters, batting .318/.369/.552 with 16 home runs, 72 RBIs, and 24 stolen bases in 27 attempts.

On September 2, 2021, it was announced that Siri would be promoted from Triple-A to the major leagues for the first time. The next day, he was put in as a pinch runner in the 9th inning against the San Diego Padres to make his MLB debut. Jake Meyers promptly hit a single that scored Siri from second base to give Siri his first run as a major leaguer. Siri made his first start in the majors on September 13 in left field. Facing the Texas Rangers, he went 4-for-5 with two home runs and 5 runs batted in. He was the first player since the RBI statistic became official in 1920 to have that many RBIs along with multiple home runs in their first-ever start as a major leaguer. In 2021 with the Astros, he batted .304/.347/.609 with 4 home runs, 9 RBIs, one walk, and 17 strikeouts in 46 at bats.

Siri made the Astros' 2022 Opening Day roster. Siri also singled in the ninth inning and scored the game-winning run for a 2–1 final score. Siri doubled and collected two hits, a stolen base and scored a run on May 25 versus the Cleveland Guardians to lead an Astros 2–1 win.

Siri also returned to play for Sugar Land in 2022.  In 16 games, he batted .296/.346/.775/1.121, scored 17 runs, and hit nine home runs with 22 RBI.

Tampa Bay Rays
The Astros traded Siri to the Tampa Bay Rays in a three-team deal on August 1, 2022, in which the Baltimore Orioles acquired Seth Johnson from Tampa, the Astros acquired Trey Mancini from Baltimore and Jayden Murray from Tampa Bay, and the Orioles also acquired Chayce McDermott from the Astros.

In 2022 between Houston and Tampa Bay he batted .213/.268/.339 in 301 at bats with 14 stolen bases in 16 attempts. He had the fastest sprint speed of all major league center fielders, at 30.4 feet/second.

See also

 List of Major League Baseball players from the Dominican Republic

References

External links

Living people
1995 births
Major League Baseball players from the Dominican Republic
Major League Baseball outfielders
Houston Astros players
Tampa Bay Rays players
Dominican Summer League Reds players
Arizona League Reds players
Billings Mustangs players
Dayton Dragons players
Gigantes del Cibao players
Daytona Tortugas players
Pensacola Blue Wahoos players
Chattanooga Lookouts players
Louisville Bats players
Sugar Land Skeeters players
Sugar Land Space Cowboys players
People from Monte Plata Province